Dematerialization of the art object is an idea in conceptual art defined as the expressive physical manifestations in which the idea is paramount and the material form is secondary.  In "Six Years: The Dematerialization of the Art Object" Lucy L. Lippard characterizes the period of 1966 to 1972 as one in which the art object was dematerialised through the new artistic practices of conceptual art.

References

The arts